Christian Cooper (born 1963) is an American science writer and editor, and also a comics writer and editor. He is based in New York City.

Career
Cooper is currently a senior biomedical editor at Health Science Communications. On May 16, 2022, National Geographic announced Cooper would host a show on their American TV channel called Extraordinary Birder, following showing species of bird around the world. A release date for the series remains to be determined.

Comics 
Cooper was Marvel's first openly gay writer and editor. He introduced the first gay male character in Star Trek, Yoshi Mishima, in the Starfleet Academy series, which was nominated for a GLAAD Media Award in 1999. He also introduced the first openly lesbian character for Marvel, Victoria Montesi and created and authored Queer Nation: The Online Gay Comic. Cooper was also an associate editor for Alpha Flight #106 in which the character Northstar came out as gay.

Cooper has written stories for Marvel Comics Presents, which often feature characters such as Ghost Rider and Vengeance. He has also edited a number of X-Men collections, and the final two issues of the Marvel Swimsuit Special.

Personal life 
Born in 1963 to parents who were both teachers, Cooper found his interest in birds while reading a birdwatching book during a roadtrip from his Long Island childhood home to California. In the 1980s, he was president of the Harvard Ornithological Club, and is currently on the Board of Directors for NYC Audubon. Cooper has a long history of LGBT activism including being the co-chair of the board of directors of GLAAD in the 1980s.

On May 25, 2020, Cooper was involved in the Central Park birdwatching incident, which led to the creation of Black Birders Week. The incident is also the basis for his online comic book about racism, illustrated by Alitha Martinez and published by DC Comics, called "It's a Bird".

Bibliography
 Marvel Comics Presents:
 "Return of the Braineaters" (featuring Ghost Rider and Werewolf by Night, with pencils by John Stanisci and inks by Jimmy Palmiotti, in Marvel Comics Presents #107–112, Marvel Comics, 1992)
 "Siege of Darkness" (featuring Ghost Rider, with pencils by Reggie Jones and inks by Fred Harper, in Marvel Comics Presents #144–146, Marvel Comics, 1993–1994)
 "Tower of Blood" (featuring Vengeance, with pencils by Reggie Jones and inks by Fred Harper, in Marvel Comics Presents #147–148, Marvel Comics, 1994)
 "The Price" (featuring Vengeance, with Fred Harper, in Marvel Comics Presents #149, Marvel Comics, 1994)
 "Dangerous Games" (featuring Vengeance, with pencils by Reggie Jones and inks by Fred Harper, in Marvel Comics Presents #152–153, Marvel Comics, 1994)
 "Altered Spirits" (featuring Vengeance, with pencils by Reggie Jones and inks by Fred Harper, in Marvel Comics Presents #156–157, Marvel Comics, 1994)
 "Final Gambit" (featuring Vengeance, with pencils by Reggie Jones and inks by Fred Harper, in Marvel Comics Presents #175, Marvel Comics, 1995)
 Darkhold #1–16 (with Richard Case, Marvel Comics, 1992–1994)
 Excalibur #77–81 (Marvel Comics, 1994)
 Star Trek: Starfleet Academy #1–19 (with pencils by Chris Renaud and inks by Andy Lanning, Marvel Comics, 1996–1998)
Songs of the Metamythos (as C. F. Cooper)
 "It's a Bird" (with Alitha E. Martinez, Mark Morales, Emilio Lopez, and Rob Clark Jr, DC Comics, 2020)

See also

 Driving while black

References

External links
 

American comics writers
Comic book editors
Harvard University alumni
Living people
Black Lives Matter
Place of birth missing (living people)
Birdwatchers
Writers from New York City
20th-century American male writers
LGBT African Americans
LGBT people from New York (state)
American gay writers
LGBT comics creators
20th-century African-American writers
21st-century African-American people
21st-century LGBT people
African-American male writers
American television hosts
1963 births